The 2012–13 Celta de Vigo season was the 82nd season in club history. Celta competed in La Liga and the Copa del Rey.

Competitions

Legend

La Liga

League table

Results summary

Matches

Copa del Rey

Round of 32

Round of 16

Squad
Squad as of 16 September 2012.

Squad information

References 

RC Celta de Vigo seasons
Celta Vigo